David Lemon (born 14 June 1969) is a British lightweight rower. He won a gold medal at the 1994 World Rowing Championships in Indianapolis with the lightweight men's eight. He also competed in the men's lightweight coxless four event at the 1996 Summer Olympics.

References

1969 births
Living people
British male rowers
World Rowing Championships medalists for Great Britain
Olympic rowers of Great Britain
Rowers at the 1996 Summer Olympics